Lingerie is an erotic softcore pornographic romantic drama television series, created by John Quinn, that aired on Cinemax from July 3, 2009, to December 24, 2010.

Synopsis
Most of the stories in this series revolve around Lacey Summers, who leaves behind her a successful career as a fashion model to design lingerie. She decides to live in a large loft that doubles as her design studio.

Cast and characters 
 Jennifer Korbin as Lacey Summers: the main character of the series. A smart, beautiful, yet sassy and vulnerable former fashion model and a designer of her line of lingerie. Most of the series revolves around her love affairs.
 Matthew Fitzgerald/Marcus Thomas as Cody Summers: Lacey's younger yet protective brother. He works as the apartment's "handyman", he later starts to do modeling. He is a jocular and light-hearted womanizer who succeeds in seducing women.
 Michael Scratch as Jason: a handsome and charming fashion photographer who's Lacey's friend and also her on-again-off-again boyfriend.
Lana Tailor as Vanessa: a bisexual aspiring actress from Seattle, who becomes Lacey's roommate. She had a brief relationship with Jason, which annoyed Lacey.
 Denise Cobar as Marilyn: Lacey's best friend, who writes for a gossip fashion magazine.
 Geoff Stevens as Jeffery: Lacey's friend, a gay fashion designer. He is very witty and sarcastic.
 Erin Brown as Stephanie: Lacey's assistant. She has an on and off relationship with Cody, though she is annoyed by his absent-mindedness.
 Emily McLeod as Joanne: Lacey's new assistant in the second season. She is a bartender at Duncan's.
 Jonathan Steen as Russ: Cody's roommate and best friend. He is a bartender at Duncan's and serves as Cody's supportive friend. He is both smart and charismatic, and the more serious of the two.
 Chris Smits as Rick: a New York City firefighter who became Lacey's short-lived love interest.
 Amber Smith as Giovanna: an established designer who uses sabotage and deceit to keep Lacey from realizing her dream.

References

External links
 

2009 American television series debuts
2010 American television series endings
2000s American drama television series
2010s American drama television series
2010s American romance television series
Cinemax original programming
Television series by Warner Bros. Television Studios
Erotic television series
2000s American romance television series
Erotic drama television series